The 2004 Thuringian state election was held on 13 June 2004 to elect the members of the 4th Landtag of Thuringia. The incumbent Christian Democratic Union (CDU) government led by Minister-President Dieter Althaus retained its majority and continued in office.

Parties
The table below lists parties represented in the 3rd Landtag of Thuringia.

Opinion polling

Election result

|-
! colspan="2" | Party
! Votes
! %
! +/-
! Seats 
! +/-
! Seats %
|-
| bgcolor=| 
| align=left | Christian Democratic Union (CDU)
| align=right| 434,088
| align=right| 43.0
| align=right| 8.0
| align=right| 45
| align=right| 4
| align=right| 51.1
|-
| bgcolor=| 
| align=left | Party of Democratic Socialism (PDS)
| align=right| 263,717
| align=right| 26.1
| align=right| 4.8
| align=right| 28
| align=right| 7
| align=right| 31.8
|-
| bgcolor=| 
| align=left | Social Democratic Party (SPD)
| align=right| 146,297
| align=right| 14.5
| align=right| 4.0
| align=right| 15
| align=right| 3
| align=right| 17.0
|-
! colspan=8|
|-
| bgcolor=| 
| align=left | Alliance 90/The Greens (Grüne)
| align=right| 45,649
| align=right| 4.5
| align=right| 2.6
| align=right| 0
| align=right| ±0
| align=right| 0
|-
| bgcolor=| 
| align=left | Free Democratic Party (FDP)
| align=right| 36,483
| align=right| 3.6
| align=right| 2.5
| align=right| 0
| align=right| ±0
| align=right| 0
|-
| bgcolor=| 
| align=left | Free Voters (FW)
| align=right| 26,302
| align=right| 2.6
| align=right| 2.6
| align=right| 0
| align=right| ±0
| align=right| 0
|-
| bgcolor=| 
| align=left | The Republicans (REP)
| align=right| 19,797
| align=right| 2.0
| align=right| 1.2
| align=right| 0
| align=right| ±0
| align=right| 0
|-
| bgcolor=| 
| align=left | National Democratic Party (NPD)
| align=right| 15,695
| align=right| 1.6
| align=right| 1.4
| align=right| 0
| align=right| ±0
| align=right| 0
|-
| bgcolor=|
| align=left | Others
| align=right| 22,550
| align=right| 2.2
| align=right| 
| align=right| 0
| align=right| ±0
| align=right| 0
|-
! align=right colspan=2| Total
! align=right| 1,010,578
! align=right| 100.0
! align=right| 
! align=right| 88
! align=right| ±0
! align=right| 
|-
! align=right colspan=2| Voter turnout
! align=right| 
! align=right| 53.8
! align=right| 6.1
! align=right| 
! align=right| 
! align=right| 
|}

Sources 
 The Federal Returning Officer

2004
2004 elections in Germany